Udaynarayanpur Madhabilata Mahavidyalaya is an undergraduate liberal arts college in Udaynarayanpur, West Bengal, India. It is in Howrah district. It is affiliated with the University of Calcutta.

Departments

Arts

Bengali
English
History
Geography
Philosophy

See also 
List of colleges affiliated to the University of Calcutta
Education in India
Education in West Bengal

References

External links
Udaynarayanpur Madhabilata Mahavidyalaya

Universities and colleges in Howrah district
University of Calcutta affiliates
Educational institutions established in 2006
2006 establishments in West Bengal